Kingsway, sometimes called Kingsway Avenue, is an arterial road in central Edmonton, Alberta, Canada, that runs on a northwest to southeast path, cutting through the city's normal grid pattern. It skirts just to the south of Edmonton City Centre Airport, and connects to Kingsway Mall and the Royal Alexandra Hospital.

Until 1939, the road was called Portage Avenue and represented the northern boundary of development. During the 1939 royal tour of Canada, 70,000 people lined the specially constructed grandstands to see the royal motorcade with King George VI, Queen Elizabeth, and Prime Minister King, the street was renamed in honour of King George VI. In 1951, their daughter, the then Princess Elizabeth, visited Edmonton, prompting the naming of the adjacent Princess Elizabeth Avenue. It starts as 118 Avenue and turns southeast by 121 Street (where the CN rail line used to be), continues straight to 97 Street and turns east again as it becomes 108A Avenue.

History 
Before the completion of Yellowhead Trail, Kingsway would stretch from 118 Avenue to St. Albert Trail, as Highway 2 would follow 109 Street to Kingsway, turn northwest, and continue to St. Albert Trail.

Neighbourhoods
List of neighbourhoods Kingsway runs through, in order from west to east.
Prince Charles
Inglewood
Prince Rupert
Queen Mary Park
Central McDougall
Spruce Avenue
McCauley

Major intersections
This is a list of major intersections, starting at the west end of Kingsway.

See also 

 Transportation in Edmonton

References

Roads in Edmonton